KZBQ (93.9 FM) is a country music format radio station located in Pocatello, Idaho, United States, serving the Pocatello area.  Its signal emanates from the KZBQ broadcast tower on Howard Mountain, east of Pocatello in Bannock County, Idaho.

KZBQ is owned and operated by Idaho Wireless Corporation, a local company that also owns and operates sister stations KOUU and KOUU-FM, in Pocatello, Idaho and KORR in American Falls, Idaho.

History
The station was assigned the callsign KZBQ on January 23, 1995.

On December 14, 2016, KZBQ moved from 93.7 FM to 93.9 FM. The station was licensed by the Federal Communications Commission to operate on that frequency on December 19, 2016.

References

External links

ZBQ
Country radio stations in the United States